The 2007 Blackpool Borough Council election took place on 3 May 2007 to elect members of the unitary Blackpool Borough Council in England. The whole council was up for election and the Conservative Party gained overall control of the council from the Labour Party.

Election Result

Ward results

Anchorsholme

Bispham

Bloomfield

Brunswick

Claremont

Clifton

Greenlands

Hawes Side

Highfield

Ingthorpe

Layton

Marton

Norbreck

Park

Squires Gate

Stanley

Talbot

Tyldesley

Victoria

Warbreck

Waterloo

References

 Results of 2007 Blackpool election

Blackpool
2007
2000s in Lancashire